Music for Elevators is a music album written and performed by Anthony Stewart Head and George Sarah. The label Beautiful Is As Beautiful Does knew that Head and Sarah had worked together on the television series Buffy the Vampire Slayer, and suggested that they should do something together. They did exactly that, and the album was released on February 5, 2002 after an 11-month recording period.

Guest appearances

Fellow Buffy cast members James Marsters, Amber Benson and Alyson Hannigan lent their vocals for use on the album. Benson sings on the songs "All The Fun Of The Fair," "Last Time," and "We Can Work It Out," while Marsters appears on "Owning My Mistakes." He can also be heard about seven minutes after the "end" of "End Game" reciting parts of "Owning My Mistakes" as a poem. Hannigan does not sing, but can be heard talking in "End Game."  Other guest vocalists include Milton Katselas, singer-songwriter Holly Palmer, actress Justina Machado, Suzy Prudden, singer Colleen Fitzpatrick and actress Camille Saviola. Joss Whedon, creator of Buffy, also wrote the song "Last Time."

Head's mother Helen Shingler contributed the instrumental song "Mum's Song," where she plays the piano.

Track listing

The lyrics are written by Anthony Head and the music is composed/arranged by both him and George Sarah, except as noted below. The instrumental parts are played by both Head and Sarah, and sometimes by other musicians. Head sings in most of the songs as well.

Personnel
 Jay Bellerose - drums
 David Mergen - cello
 Camille Saviola - bass voice
 Veikko Lepisto - upright bass
 Amber Benson
 Anthony Stewart Head - vocals
 George Sarah - guitar, acoustic guitar, strings, piano, Fender Rhodes piano, Wurlitzer organ, synthesizer, bass guitar, tambourine, bells
 Holly Palmer - vocals
 Kristen Autry - violin, viola
 Tom MacDonald - piano

References

External links
George Sarah – official Website
How the album came to be at Anthony Head's official website.
Interview with George Sarah on doing Music for Elevators: part 1, 2 and 3 at Mania.
Reviews at Amazon.com
Lyrics and song info at ashead.com

2002 albums
Anthony Head albums
Collaborative albums
George Sarah albums